Sami ul Haq (Samī'u’l-Ḥaq; 18 December 1937 – 2 November 2018) was a Pakistani religious scholar and senator. He was known as the Father of Taliban for the role his seminary Darul Uloom Haqqania played in the graduation of most Taliban leaders and commanders, He had close ties to Taliban leader Mullah Mohammed Omar.  

With his party Jamiat Ulema-e-Islam (S), which split from Jamiat Ulema-e-Islam (F) because Haq supported Zia-ul-Haq and his policies, he was a member of the Senate of Pakistan from 1985 to 1991 and again from 1991 to 1997. 

After his assassination in 2018 his son Hamid Ul Haq Haqqani became the chancellor of the seminary and the ameer or head of the political party.

Early life and family 
Haq was born on 18 December 1937 in Akora Khattak, North-West Frontier Province of British India (now Khyber Pakhtunkhwa, Pakistan). His father was Abdul Haq Akorwi, who was educated at Darul Uloom Deoband in India. He began his education in 1366 AH (1946 or 1947 CE) at Darul Uloom Haqqania, which was founded by his father. He was well versed in Arabic but also used Urdu, the national language of Pakistan, and the regional language of Pashto.

He had four brothers, including Anwarul Haq Haqqani, responsible of the seminary’s administration, and Mehmood Ul Haq Haqqani, who was professor of chemistry at the Peshawar University and who also served as Pakistan’s deputy ambassador to Saudi Arabia, while he himself married twice and had nine children.

Career
Sami-ul-Haq was regarded as the "Father of the Taliban" and had close ties to Taliban leader Mullah Mohammed Omar. Sami ul Haq was the chancellor of Darul Uloom Haqqania, a Deobandi Islamic seminary which is the alma mater of many prominent Taliban members. Haq served as chairman of the Difa-e-Pakistan Council and was the leader of his own faction of the Jamiat Ulema-e-Islam political party, known as JUI-S. Sami ul-Haq was also a founding member of a six-party religious alliance Muttahida Majlis-e-Amal ahead of 2002 general election.

He had also served as a member of the Senate of Pakistan. He formed Muttahida Deeni Mahaz (United Religious Front), an alliance of relatively small religio-political parties, to participate in the 2013 general election.

Haq stated that the US Ambassador to Pakistan, Richard G. Olson,  
visited him in July 2013 to discuss the situation of the region. Haq sympathized with the Taliban, stating: "Give them just one year and they will make the whole of Afghanistan happy... The whole of Afghanistan will be with them ... Once the Americans leave, all of this will happen within a year... As long as they are there, Afghans will have to fight for their freedom," Haq said. "It's a war for freedom. It will not stop until outsiders leave."

In October 2018, an Afghan delegation comprising Ashraf Ghani government representatives and diplomats stationed in Pakistan, met Samiul Haq asking him to play a role in restoring peace in Afghanistan by bringing the Afghan Taliban back to the dialogue table.

. Police said they also seized her diary, which contained a list of clients, and visiting cards of businessmen, leading bureaucrats and Islamabad-based diplomats. She claimed if she would be taken down she would take down others and Tahira claimed her most frequent customers included at least om. While denying any involvement, Maulana Sami ul-Haq resigned as vice president of the Islamic Democratic Alliance government and as a senator. "I'm innocent. I've been framed by government agencies for opposing official policies," he shouted in the House. Later he resigned from office and focused on administration of madrasas under his control.

Fatwa
After Tehrik-i-Taliban Pakistan initiated a campaign against polio immunisation, forcing hundreds of thousands of children to miss vaccinations, on 9 December 2013 Maulana Sami ul Haq issued a fatwa in favour of polio vaccination. The fatwa said "vaccination against deadly diseases is helpful in their prevention according to research conducted by renowned medical specialists. It adds that the vaccines used against these diseases are in no way harmful".

Assassination
On 2 November 2018, Sami-ul-Haq was assassinated at around 7:00 pm PST at his residence in Bahria Town, Rawalpindi. He was stabbed multiple times. He was taken to the nearby Safari Hospital where he was pronounced dead on arrival. The cause of his death was excessive blood loss due to the multiple stabbing across his body, including his face. According to his guard, he had intended to join the protests against the acquittal of Asia Bibi in Islamabad, but he could not join it due to road blockage.

Following the assassination, the Khyber Pakhtunkhwa government declared a day of mourning. Prime Minister Imran Khan condemned the murder saying "the country has suffered a great loss".

On 3 November 2018, he was buried in the premises of Darul Uloom Haqqania in his hometown of Akora Khattak in the afternoon. The funeral prayer was offered at the Khushal Khan Degree College and led by his son Hamid Ul Haq Haqqani. It was attended by a large number of political leaders and his followers. As part of the investigation into his murder, the police questioned his domestic staff.

Books
The editor-in-chief of the monthly journal Al-Haq until his death, he has been described as "a prolific Islamist writer" who "authored more than 20 books", some of his works including :
Islām aur ʻaṣr-i ḥāz̤ir, 1976. On Islam and the modern world, collected articles. 
Qādiyān sey Isrāʼīl tak, 1978. Critical assessment of the Ahmadiyya movement. 
Kārvān-i āk̲h̲irat, 1990. Collection of condolence letters on the death of various South Asian religious scholars.
Ṣalibī dahshatgardī aur ʻālam-i Islām, 2004. Collection of interviews discussing Taliban movement, United States of America and West interests in Afghanistan.
Qādiyānī fitnah aur Millat-i Islāmiyah kā mauʼqqif , 2011. Criticism of the Ahmadiyya movement, co-authored with Muhammad Taqi Usmani.
K̲h̲ut̤bāt-i mashāhīr, 2015. Collected sermons on religious life in Islam, Islam and conduct of life and Islam and politics, in 10 volumes.
Afghan Taliban: War of Ideology : Struggle for Peace, 2015. His last notable book, on the peace process in Afghanistan.

References

Sources
 
 
 Pakistan religious schools get scrutiny, Mark Magnier, Los Angeles Times
 The 'university of holy war', Haroon Rashid, BBC Online
 Pakistan: The Taliban takeover, Ziauddin Sardar, New Statesman
 Education mullah style, Tony Cross, Radio France Internationale
 EU snub for hardline Pakistan MP, BBC News Online
 EU snub draws Pakistani protest, BBC News Online
Maulana Sami ul Haq – Khyber.org website

Pashtun people
Jamiat Ulema-e-Islam (F) politicians
1937 births
2018 deaths
Deobandis
Members of the Senate of Pakistan
Pakistani Islamists
Deaths by stabbing in Pakistan
Assassinated Pakistani politicians
Pakistani religious leaders
Chancellors of the Darul Uloom Haqqania
Critics of Ahmadiyya
Darul Uloom Haqqania alumni
Darul Uloom Deoband alumni
Jamiat Ulema-e-Islam (S) politicians
Academic staff of Darul Uloom Haqqania